Baturité is a city of Ceará State, Brazil  from the state capital Fortaleza. It is located in the microregion of Baturité. The population estimate in 2020 was 35,941 inhabitants.

Economy 

The economy of Baturité is mainly agricultural and based on the cultivation of cotton, sugar cane, rice, maize and beans.

History  
Baturité received the first railway in the state of Ceará. It started to operate in 1873. Today, this train station is a museum.

Notable people
 

Nilto Maciel (1945–2014), writer

References

Municipalities in Ceará